Bussang (or Büssing) is a commune in the Vosges department in Grand Est in Northeastern France. Known as the source of the Moselle River.

See also
Communes of the Vosges department

References

External links

Official site

Communes of Vosges (department)